John Morressy (December 8, 1930 – March 20, 2006) was an American science fiction and fantasy writer and a professor of English at Franklin Pierce College.

He died at Sullivan, New Hampshire where he lived.

Bibliography

Novels
 The Blackboard Cavalier (1966)
 The Addison Tradition (1968)
 A Long Communion (1974)
 The Humans of Ziax II (1974)
 The Windows of Forever (1975)
 The Extraterritorial (1977)
 The Drought on Ziax II (1978)
 The Juggler (1996)
Del Whitby series
 Starbrat (1972)
 Stardrift (1973; also known as Nail Down the Stars)
 Under a Calculating Star (1975)
 A Law for the Stars (1976)
 Frostworld and Dreamfire (1977)
 The Mansions of Space (1983)
Iron Angel series
 Ironbrand (1980)
 Greymantle (1981)
 Kingsbane (1982)
 The Time of the Annihilator (1985)
Kedrigern series
 A Voice for Princess (1986)
 The Questing of Kedrigern (1987)
Kedrigern in Wanderland (1988)
 Kedrigern and the Charming Couple (1989)
 A Remembrance for Kedrigern (1990)
 The Domesticated Wizard (2002; omnibus including A Voice for Princess and The Questing of Kedrigern, plus 6 short stories)
 Dudgeon and Dragons (2003; omnibus including Kedrigern in Wanderland and Kedrigern and the Dragon comme il faut-New, plus 8 short stories)
The Apprentice Kedrigern (Young Kedrigern) series
 Young Kedrigern and First Spell (published only in Czech, 1998)
 Young Kedrigern and Search for the Past (published only in Czech, 1999)
 Young Kedrigern: The Making of A Wizard (published only in Czech, 2001)

Short fiction 
Collections
 Other Stories (1983)
Stories

 "Autumn Sunshine for Moe Joost" (1979)
 "No More Pencils, No More Books" (1979)
 "The Last Jerry Fagin Show" (1980)
 "A Hedge Against Alchemy" (1981)
 "Final Version" (1982; included in 100 Short Short Fantasy Stories)
 "Stoneskin" (1984)
 "Spirits from the Vasty Deep" (1986)
 "Alaska" (1989)
 "Timekeeper" (1990)
 "A Boy and His Wolf: Three Versions of a Fable" (1993; in the anthology Xanadu)
 "The Persistence of Memory" (1998)
 "Laugh Clone Laugh"  (Playboy Magazine, May 1986)

References

External links
 
 
 Independent (UK) Obituary. April 1, 2009.

1930 births
2006 deaths
20th-century American male writers
20th-century American novelists
20th-century American short story writers
American male novelists
American male short story writers
American science fiction writers
Franklin Pierce University faculty
The Magazine of Fantasy & Science Fiction people
People from Sullivan, New Hampshire
Writers from Brooklyn